espnstar.com was a sports news website operated by ESPN Star Sports, a joint venture between ESPN International and STAR TV/Fox International Channels that broadcasts to audiences in China, Hong Kong, Taiwan, India and Southeast Asia. In addition to news, it contained columns and blogs by the network's leading personalities. In 2013, approximately 59 percent of visitors to espnstar.com come from India.

As of 2020, the site was no longer linked to ESPN Star Sports, and instead redirected to an Indonesian, sports blog.

References

External links 
espnstar.com
ESPN STAR Sports on Facebook
ESPN STAR Sports on Twitter

ESPN.com
Asian news websites